The Grand Venice Mall, also known as TGV Mall is an Italian-themed shopping mall in Greater Noida, Uttar Pradesh, India. It covers 947,000 square feet and was opened in 2015. It is decorated with replicas of Roman statues and Venetian buildings, and has two canals with gondola rides for visitors.

The mall has 258 stores representing Indian and international chains and brands. It also includes a food court, Mastiii Zone entertainment area with features such as a snow theme park (Snow Mastiii), zip line ride, VR games, trampoline park, adventure park, a bowling alley, cricket lanes, 7D cinema, horror house and a Cinépolis multiplex cinema.

The Grand Venice Mall is located in Plot No SH3, Site IV, Greater Noida, adjacent to Pari Chowk metro station.

See also
 List of shopping malls in India

References

External links
 Noida: The Grand Venice Mall

Shopping malls in Uttar Pradesh
2015 establishments in Uttar Pradesh
Noida
Shopping malls established in 2015